Jugo is a hamlet and council located in the municipality of Zuia, in Álava province, Basque Country, Spain. As of 2020, it has a population of 35.

Geography 
Jugo is located 21km northwest of Vitoria-Gasteiz.

References

Populated places in Álava